The Moldavian Progressive Party was a political party in Bessarabia.

External links  
 ROMÂNII DIN BUGEAC 
 DICTIONAR AL MEMBRILOR SFATULUI TARII DIN CHISINAU (VI)

See also 
 Sfatul Țării

References 

 

Defunct political parties in Moldova
Political parties established in 1917
Moldavian Democratic Republic